Alatalo is a Finnish surname. Notable people with the surname include:

Mika Alatalo (born 1971), Finnish ice hockey player
Mikko Alatalo (born 1951), Finnish musician and politician
Santeri Alatalo (born 1990), Finnish ice hockey player
Toimi Alatalo (1929–2014), Finnish cross-country skier
William Alatalo (born 2002), Finnish racing driver

Finnish-language surnames